Henry Hughes Hough (January 8, 1871 – September 9, 1943) was a Rear Admiral of the United States Navy and one-time military Governor of the United States Virgin Islands. In 1923 he was the director of the Office of Naval Intelligence. He commanded the Yangtze Patrol from 1925 to 1927.

Biography

He was born on January 8, 1871, in the French overseas colony of Saint-Pierre and Miquelon, off the coast of Newfoundland.

Hough graduated from the United States Naval Academy in 1891. He served on board the torpedo boat  during the Spanish–American War. Following the war, he alternated assignments in the Naval Intelligence office with ship-board duties. In 1911, he was made the Navy attache to France and, later, to Russia. From 1914 to 1915, he was given his first command: the gunboat , assigned to the Naval Academy. In 1918, he was made a Staff Representative and district commander in Brest, France, as part of the overall Naval Forces, France Command. He was subsequently also a commissioner of the Prisoner of War Conference in Berne, Switzerland.

In 1922, while still a Captain, he was appointed as the Governor of the United States Virgin Islands, a role that he only acted in for a year. Hough was the first non-acting military governor to govern as a Captain, rather than a Rear Admiral, and the first not to be born in the United States.

In 1923, he was appointed as Director of Naval Intelligence and the following year on June 14, 1924, he was promoted to Rear Admiral. He commanded the Yangtze Patrol from 1925 until December 5, 1927, when command was assumed by Rear Admiral Yates Stirling Jr.  He retired from the Navy in 1935 and died in 1943.

Hough is buried in Arlington National Cemetery in Virginia. Hough was survived by his wife, Flaurence Oliphant (1877–1970).

References

Further reading
 "SIX RECEIVE PROMOTION TO ADMIRAL". Los Angeles Times. Los Angeles, Calif.: Jun 15, 1924. pg. 5, 1 pgs

1871 births
1943 deaths
People from Saint Pierre and Miquelon
Governors of the United States Virgin Islands
United States Navy rear admirals
Burials at Arlington National Cemetery
Directors of the Office of Naval Intelligence